"Bye Bye Mr. Mug" is the debut single by Japanese rock band the Brilliant Green. It was released by Sony Music Records on September 21, 1997, and re-released by Defstar Records on October 1, 2000.

The song also appears on the band's compilation albums Complete Single Collection '97–'08 (2008) and The Swingin' Sixties (2014).

Track listing

References

1997 singles
1997 songs
1997 debut singles
English-language Japanese songs
Songs written by Shunsaku Okuda
Songs written by Tomoko Kawase
The Brilliant Green songs